Oleh Viktorovych Koliev (born 9 May 1973) is a Ukrainian politician currently serving as a People's Deputy of Ukraine representing Ukraine's 134th electoral district from Servant of the People since 2019.

Early life and career 
Prior to his election, Koliev worked as a history teacher, as well as a journalist for local media outlets. He was director of the Trans-Danubian News Editorial Gazette.

Political career 
In the 2019 Ukrainian parliamentary election, Koliev was the candidate of Servant of the People for People's Deputy of Ukraine in Ukraine's 134th electoral district. At the time of the election, he was an independent. Chervonenko garnered 16.85% of the vote, Chekita 8.52%, and Firsenko 7.32%.

In the Verkhovna Rada, Koliev joined the Servant of the People faction, as well as the Verkhovna Rada Law Enforcement Committee. He also joined the For Odeshchyna inter-factional association.

References 

1973 births
Living people
Ninth convocation members of the Verkhovna Rada
People from Odesa Oblast
Servant of the People (political party) politicians